Kilmac may refer to:

 Kilmac Stadium, a football stadium in Dundee, Scotland
 Kilmacthomas, a town in County Waterford, Ireland (known locally as 'Kilmac')